Thank You Happy Birthday is the second studio album by American rock band Cage the Elephant. It was released on January 11, 2011 to positive critical reception. The album was produced by Jay Joyce, who worked in the same capacity on the band's eponymous debut album.

Recording and production
The album was originally announced in July 2009 when the band had stated that they would release it in early 2010 with the title Computer Says Move. The group had recorded over eighty songs but shelved all of them when they realized that "nobody was really into" any of the ideas. The group then took ideas that they had saved for "side projects" and decided to use those songs for the album, which was then given the current title. The band once again worked with Jay Joyce, who had helped them record their first album. The band had trouble recording the songs, with lead singer Matt Shultz in particular having trouble finding the inspiration to write the lyrics for songs such as "Flow." The group was able to work out twelve songs for the album, stating: "We want each of our songs to sound like it's been written by a different band."

Track listing

B sides

Singles
The first single, titled "Shake Me Down", was released on November 22, 2010, and was announced by the band via their Twitter account as being played on radio stations from November 17 onward. Also on November 17, they released an unofficial video for the song. On January 11, 2011, the official video was released. For the week of February 25 through March 5, 2011, the single was number 1 on Billboard Rock Songs chart. In the week of January 11 the band was named the MTV PUSH artist of the week.

On the November 18, 2010, "2024" was made a free download on Filter magazine's website.

On December 27, 2010, "Around My Head" was released as the free song of the week on iTunes. The song was later released as an official single on 4 May 2011. In the week of 6 July 2011, the single charted at number 18 on Billboard Alternative Songs.

The second track on the album, "Aberdeen" was released as a single on September 15, 2011.

Release
The album was released on January 11, 2011, and on its first day debuted at number 1 on the iTunes Top Downloads chart. That same night, the group appeared on the Late Show with David Letterman. During its first week of release, the album sold over 39,000 copies in the US, debuting at number 2 on the Billboard 200. On 27 January 2011 the band promoted the album even further, performing "Shake Me Down" and "Aberdeen" on Jimmy Kimmel Live! for the Jimmy Kimmel Live! Concert Series on ABC. Shortly after this, the group performed "Shake Me Down" on Fuel TV program The Daily Habit.

The album was released in the UK on March 21, 2011.

A vinyl version of the album was released, included in the package was a 7-inch single of the acoustic version of "Right Before My Eyes", simply titled "Shiver", due to the original working title being "Timber Me Shivers".

Reception

The reception for the album has been generally positive. Metacritic, which assigns a normalized rating out of 100, currently gives it a score of 76/100 based on twenty-two critics' reviews. Alternative Press stated that the record was "an alarmingly good album." Jon Pareles of The New York Times added that "the new album is more abrasive, rowdier, more unstable and pushier in the right ways," going on to say that when the album is "[p]layed quietly, like a Beatles ballad, it's brave enough to set bravado aside." Jody Rosen of Rolling Stone said of lead singer Matt Shultz: "Shultz coos, 'All I got is nothing but a little bit of love.' He's got another thing, actually: one of rock's best young bands."

Legacy
Matt Shultz would later look back on the album five years after the release of "Shake Me Down", in an interview with Alternative Nation. He said, "There are definitely some times where I look back and wish I had let more of myself into the album. Earlier in my life, I had so much stock in the persona, and believed too much in 'the character' in the realm of pop and rock music, whatever pedal you want to put on it. The modern… whatever. It’s part of the story, and it is what it was."

Certifications

References

2011 albums
Cage the Elephant albums
RCA Records albums
Albums produced by Jay Joyce